Hyson is an early gunboat of the Qing dynasty.

History
Hyson was an armed steamer of the Ever Victorious Army. She was an amphibious vessel, outfitted with wheels that would allow her to move on land.

She was originally commanded by an American named Davidson, and later by Charles George Gordon. In 1863, carrying around 350 men and some field artillery, she took part in the retaking of Quinsan.

She was purchased in April or May 1865 by Shanghai daotai Ding Richang on orders from Li Hongzhang. In July or August 1865, she was transferred to the Shanghai's Pirate Suppression Bureau, and performed patrol duties near Shanghai.

Hyson was eventually transferred to the Qing customs and renamed Ching Po. She was sold in 1877.

Citations

References

 
 
 
 

Naval ships of Imperial China
Gunboats of China
Naval ships of China